Huntington Castle may refer to:

 Huntington Castle, a ruined 13th century castle in Herefordshire, England
 Huntington Castle, Clonegal, a 17th-century castle in County Carlow, Ireland

See also
 Huntingdon Castle, a demolished 11th century castle in Cambridgeshire, England